Oskar Steen (born 9 March 1998) is a Swedish professional ice hockey forward. He is currently playing with the Providence Bruins in the American Hockey League (AHL) as a prospect to the Boston Bruins organization of the National Hockey League (NHL). Steen was drafted by the Bruins in the sixth round, 165th overall, of the 2016 NHL Entry Draft. He previously played for the Färjestad BK of the Swedish Hockey League (SHL).

Playing career
Steen made his Swedish Hockey League debut with Färjestad BK during the 2015–16 SHL season. He was selected by the Bruins in the sixth round (165th overall) of the 2016 NHL Entry Draft. On May 3, 2019, it was announced that the Bruins had signed Steen to a three-year entry-level contract.

On 10 September 2020, with the North American season to be delayed, Steen was loaned by the Bruins to join Swedish Allsvenskan club, IF Björklöven, to begin the 2020–21 season until the commencement of the Bruins training camp.

On 24 October 2021, Steen registered his first NHL point with an assist on a Jake DeBrusk goal in a 4–3 victory versus the San Jose Sharks. On 4 January 2022, Steen scored his first NHL goal in a 5–3 victory versus the New Jersey Devils.

International play 

Steen has won a medal at every junior level. He first represented Sweden at the 2015 World U-17 Hockey Challenge winning the bronze medal. He made his IIHF World U20 Championship debut in 2018 winning the silver medal after losing to Canada in the final.

Career statistics

Regular season and playoffs

International

References

External links

1998 births
Living people
IF Björklöven players
Boston Bruins draft picks
Boston Bruins players
Färjestad BK players
Modo Hockey players
Providence Bruins players
Sportspeople from Karlstad
Swedish ice hockey centres